Ilyinskoye is a rural locality (a selo) and the administrative center of Pokrovskoye Rural Settlement, Velikoustyugsky District, Vologda Oblast, Russia. The population was 155 as of 2002.

Geography 
Ilyinskoye is located 35 km southeast of Veliky Ustyug (the district's administrative centre) by road. Maloye Chebayevo is the nearest rural locality.

References 

Rural localities in Velikoustyugsky District